Sweden was represented at the Junior Eurovision Song Contest 2005 in Hasselt, Belgium by M+ with "Gränslös kärlek". The duo of Maria Chabo and Maria Josefson were the winner of Lilla Melodifestivalen 2005, used to select the Swedish entry for the contest.

Before Junior Eurovision

Lilla Melodifestivalen 2005 
Organised by Swedish broadcaster Sveriges Television (SVT), Lilla Melodifestivalen 2005 was the national selection used to select the Swedish entry to the Junior Eurovision Song Contest 2005. After much deliberation by SVT on what date to host the show, it was finally decided to host it on 7 October 2005.

The show was hosted by singer Nanne Grönvall and comedian Shan Atci. The votes of five regional juries and televoting selected the winner from the ten competing songs selected from the 1400 songs submitted to SVT to compete.

At Junior Eurovision
On the night of the contest, held in Hasselt in Belgium, M+ performed 6th in the running order of the contest, following United Kingdom and preceding Russia. At the close of the voting "Gränslös kärlek" received 22 points, placing 15th of the 16 competing entries.

Voting

Notes

References

External links
Lilla Melodifestivalen 2005 Sveriges Television

Junior Eurovision Song Contest
Sweden
2005